Elwood is an unincorporated community and census-designated place (CDP) located within Mullica Township in Atlantic County, New Jersey, United States. As of the 2010 United States Census, the CDP's population was 1,437. At previous censuses, the area was listed by the U.S. Census Bureau as the Elwood-Magnolia CDP. The area is served as United States Postal Service ZIP code 08217.

Geography
According to the United States Census Bureau, Elwood had a total area of 3.206 square miles (8.304 km2), including 3.205 square miles (8.301 km2) of land and 0.001 square miles (0.002 km2) of water (0.03%).

Demographics

Census 2010

Census 2000
As of the 2000 United States Census there were 1,392 people, 427 households, and 333 families living in the CDP. The population density was 166.9/km2 (431.7/mi2). There were 453 housing units at an average density of 54.3/km2 (140.5/mi2). The racial makeup of the CDP was 56.75% White, 13.79% African American, 0.36% Native American, 0.86% Asian, 0.22% Pacific Islander, 23.13% from other races, and 4.89% from two or more races. Hispanic or Latino of any race were 36.85% of the population.

There were 427 households, out of which 39.8% had children under the age of 18 living with them, 56.0% were married couples living together, 15.0% had a female householder with no husband present, and 21.8% were non-families. 16.9% of all households were made up of individuals, and 6.8% had someone living alone who was 65 years of age or older. The average household size was 3.17 and the average family size was 3.55.

In the CDP the population was spread out, with 30.2% under the age of 18, 8.7% from 18 to 24, 30.0% from 25 to 44, 22.8% from 45 to 64, and 8.4% who were 65 years of age or older. The median age was 34 years. For every 100 females, there were 101.2 males. For every 100 females age 18 and over, there were 97.2 males.

The median income for a household in the CDP was $42,105, and the median income for a family was $44,688. Males had a median income of $31,516 versus $24,167 for females. The per capita income for the CDP was $13,678. About 22.4% of families and 24.5% of the population were below the poverty line, including 42.0% of those under age 18 and 27.3% of those age 65 or over.

References

Census-designated places in Atlantic County, New Jersey
Mullica Township, New Jersey